Lakeline is a Capital MetroRail commuter rail station in Austin, Texas, located at the corner of Lakeline Boulevard and Lyndhurst Streets.  It also is co-located with the Lakeline Park and Ride (formerly Northwest Park and Ride) and serves Lakeline Mall which is a mile away. Lakeline is one of two stations located within Williamson County alongside Leander as opposed to Travis County which contains the other seven locations.

Lakeline serves as the midday and Saturday terminus for the MetroRail Red Line, as Leander is only in service during rush hour.

Transit connections
 #214 Northwest Feeder
 #383 Research
 #985 Leander/Lakeline Direct
 #987 Leander/Lakeline Express

References

External links
 Lakeline station overview
 Lakeline station map

Capital MetroRail stations in Austin
Railway stations in the United States opened in 2010
Railway stations in Williamson County, Texas
2010 establishments in Texas